Wilfred Sydney Charlton (12 September 1933 – January 2016) was an English footballer who played as a wing half in the Football League for Southport and Tranmere Rovers. He was on the books of Portsmouth and Huddersfield Town without representing either in the League, and also played for Sankeys.

References

1933 births
2016 deaths
People from Blyth, Northumberland
Footballers from Northumberland
Association football wing halves
English footballers
Portsmouth F.C. players
Huddersfield Town A.F.C. players
Southport F.C. players
Tranmere Rovers F.C. players
GKN Sankey F.C. players
English Football League players